Convoy PQ 14 was an Arctic convoy sent from Britain by the Western Allies to aid the Soviet Union during the Second World War. Convoys from Britain had been despatched since August 1941 and advantage had been taken of the perpetual darkness of the Arctic winter. German operations against the convoys had been muted due to the need to support Operation Barbarossa, confidence in imminent victory and the small size of the convoys. In late 1941 and early 1942 the Luftwaffe and Kriegsmarine had reinforced Norway with aircraft and ships.

The convoy sailed in April 1942, when the hours of daylight were increasing and the Polar ice had yet to recede. On the night of 10/11 April, thirty hours' sailing in fog and pack ice caused so much damage that 16 vessels had to turn back and return to Iceland. On 16 April, air and U-boat attacks sank one merchant ship and the seven remaining ships in the convoy reached Murmansk. The Allies would have to run larger convoys during the hazardous summer months to catch up with deliveries.

The co-ordination of German aircraft and submarine attacks caused the Navy concern as daylight hours increased towards the perpetual daylight of the midnight sun. Despite the recent reinforcement of convoy escorts, the last four days of the voyage would be under continuous observation and submarine attacks would increase just as the escorts were inhibited by shortage of fuel; the Navy predicted serious losses.

Background

Lend-lease

After Operation Barbarossa, the German invasion of the USSR, began on 22 June 1941, the UK and USSR signed an agreement in July that they would "render each other assistance and support of all kinds in the present war against Hitlerite Germany". Before September 1941 the British had dispatched 450 aircraft,  of rubber, 3,000,000 pairs of boots and stocks of tin, aluminium, jute, lead and wool. In September British and US representatives travelled to Moscow to study Soviet requirements and their ability to meet them. The representatives of the three countries drew up a protocol in October 1941 to last until June 1942 and to agree new protocols to operate from 1 July to 30 June of each following year until the end of Lend-Lease. The protocol listed supplies, monthly rates of delivery and totals for the period.

The first protocol specified the supplies to be sent but not the ships to move them. The USSR turned out to lack the ships and escorts and the British and Americans, who had made a commitment to "help with the delivery", undertook to deliver the supplies for want of an alternative. The main Soviet need in 1941 was military equipment to replace losses because, at the time of the negotiations, two large aircraft factories were being moved east from Leningrad and two more from Ukraine. It would take at least eight months to resume production, until when, aircraft output would fall from 80 to 30 aircraft per day. Britain and the US undertook to send 400 aircraft a month, at a ratio of three bombers to one fighter (later reversed), 500 tanks a month and 300 Bren gun carriers. The Anglo-Americans also undertook to send  of aluminium and 3, 862 machine tools, along with sundry raw materials food and medical supplies.

British grand strategy
The growing German air strength in Norway and increasing losses to convoys and their escorts, led Rear-Admiral Stuart Bonham Carter, commander of the 18th Cruiser Squadron, Admiral sir John Tovey, Commander in Chief Home Fleet and Admiral Sir Dudley Pound the First Sea Lord, the professional head of the Royal Navy, unanimously to advocate the suspension of Arctic convoys during the summer months. The small number of Russian ships available to meet Arctic convoys, losses inflicted by  based in Norway and the presence of the German battleship  in Norway from early 1942, had led to a large number of ships full of supplies to Russia becoming stranded at the west end and empty and damaged ships waiting at the east end. Despite the views of the Navy, Churchill came under pressure from the president of the United States, Franklin D. Roosevelt and the Soviet leader, Joseph Stalin, bowed to political reality and ordered the dispatch of a larger convoy to reduce the backlog,

PQ 13 had been the first convoy to suffer serious casualties, five ships being sunk by submarines, aircraft and surface ships. Tovey asked the Russians for more submarine patrols in the Barents Sea and more destroyer escorts for the final leg of convoys. More escorts were diverted from Western Approaches Command to increase the close escort to about ten vessels. Bomber Command had sent 33 Halifax heavy bombers to attack Tirpitz on 31 March in exceedingly poor weather, through which few aircraft managed to bomb, no hits were obtained and five of the Halifaxes were shot down. PQ 14 was larger than earlier convoys.

Signals intelligence

The British Government Code and Cypher School (GC&CS) based at Bletchley Park housed a small industry of code-breakers and traffic analysts that intercepted and decoded German naval transmissions. By June 1941, the German Enigma machine Home Waters settings used by surface ships and U-boats could quickly be read. On 1 February 1942, the Enigma machines used in U-boats in the Atlantic and Mediterranean were changed but German ships and the U-boats in Arctic waters continued with the older  ( from 1942, code-named Dolphin by the British). By mid-1941, British Y-stations were able to read  wireless telegraphy (W/T) transmissions and give advance warning of Luftwaffe operations. In 1941, interception parties (code-named Headaches) embarked on warships.

In March 1942, Adolf Hitler issued a directive for a greater anti-convoy effort to weaken the Red Army and prevent Allied troops being transferred to northern Russia, preparatory to a landing on the coast of northern Norway. At the end of March, the air fleet was divided.  [ Alexander Holle], the largest command, was based at Kirkenes with 2./JG 5, 10.(Z)/JG 5, 1./StG 5 (Dive Bomber Wing 5) and 1. 124 [1./(F) 124] (1 Squadron, Long Range Reconnaissance Wing 124) charged with attacks on Murmansk and Archangelsk as well as attacks on convoys. 

( Hans Roth) was based at Bardufoss but had no permanently attached units, which were added according to events.

Luftwaffe tactics
As soon as information was received about the assembly of a convoy,  would send long-range reconnaissance aircraft to search Iceland and northern Scotland. Once a convoy was spotted aircraft were to keep contact as far as possible in the extreme weather of the area. If contact was lost its course at the last sighting would be extrapolated and overlapping sorties would be flown to regain contact. All three  were to co-operate as the convoy moved through their operational areas.  would begin the anti-convoy operation east to a line from the North Cape to Spitzbergen Island, whence  would take over using his and 's aircraft, which would to Kirkenes or Petsamo to stay in range.  was not allowed to divert aircraft to ground support during the operation. As soon as the convoy came into range, the aircraft were to keep up a continuous attack until the convoy docked at Murmansk or Archangelsk.

From late March to late May the air effort against PQ 13, 14, 15 and QP 9, 10 and 11 had little effect, twelve sinkings out of 16 lost in PQ convoys and two out of five sinkings from QP convoys being credited to the Luftwaffe; 166 merchant ships had sailed for Russia and 145 had survived the journey. Bad weather had been nearly as dangerous as the Luftwaffe but in April, the spring thaw grounded many Luftwaffe aircraft and in May bad weather led to contact being lost and convoys scattering, being impossible to find in the long Arctic night. When air attacks on convoys had taken place, the formations rarely amounted to more than twelve aircraft, greatly simplifying the task of convoy anti-aircraft gunners, who shot down several aircraft in April and May. From 152 aircraft in January, reinforcements to  5 increased its strength to 221 front-line aircraft by March 1942.

Air-sea rescue

Co-operation was as important in rescues as it was in anti-shipping operations if people were to be saved before they succumbed to the climate and severe weather. The sea rescue aircraft comprised Heinkel He 59 floatplanes, Dornier Do 18 and Dornier Do 24 seaplanes.

 (OKL, the high command of the Luftwaffe) was not able to increase the number of search and rescue aircraft in Norway, due to a general shortage of aircraft and crews, despite Stumpff pointing out that coming down in such cold waters required extremely swift recovery and that his crews "must be given a chance of rescue" or morale could not be maintained. After the experience of PQ 16, Stumpff gave the task to the coastal reconnaissance squadrons, whose aircraft were not usually engaged in attacks on convoys. They would henceforth stand by to rescue aircrew during anti-shipping operations.

Prelude

Arctic Ocean

Between Greenland and Norway are some of the most stormy waters of the world's oceans,  of water under gales full of snow, sleet and hail. Around the North Cape and the Barents Sea the sea temperature rarely rises above 4° Celsius and a man in the water would probably die unless rescued immediately. The cold water and air made spray freeze on the superstructure of ships, which had to be removed quickly to avoid the ship becoming top-heavy. The cold Arctic water was met by the Gulf Stream, warm water from the Gulf of Mexico, which became the North Atlantic Drift, arriving at the south-west of England the drift moves between Scotland and Iceland. North of Norway the drift splits.

A northern stream goes north of Bear Island to Svalbard and the southern stream following the coast of Murmansk into the Barents Sea. The mingling of cold Arctic water and warmer water of higher salinity generates thick banks of fog for convoys to hide in. The waters drastically reduced the effectiveness of ASDIC as U-boats moved in waters of differing temperatures and density. The area is in perpetual darkness in winter and permanent daylight in the summer which makes air reconnaissance almost impossible or easy.

Arctic convoys

The first convoy was due at Murmansk around 12 October and the next convoy was to depart Iceland on 22 October. A motley of British, Allied and neutral shipping loaded with military stores and raw materials for the Soviet war effort would be assembled at Hvalfjörður in Iceland, convenient for ships from both sides of the Atlantic. By late 1941, the convoy system used in the Atlantic had been established on the Arctic run; a convoy commodore ensured that the ships' masters and signals officers attended a briefing to make arrangements for the management of the convoy, which sailed in a formation of long rows of short columns. The commodore was usually a retired naval officer or a Royal Naval Reserveist and would be aboard one of the merchant ships (identified by a white pendant with a blue cross). The commodore was assisted by a Naval signals party of four men, who used lamps, semaphore flags and telescopes to pass signals in code.

In large convoys, the commodore was assisted by vice- and rear-commodores with whom he directed the speed, course and zig-zagging of the merchant ships and liaised with the escort commander. By the end of 1941, 187 Matilda II and 249 Valentine tanks had been delivered, comprising 25 per cent of the medium-heavy tanks in the Red Army and 30 to 40 per cent of the medium-heavy tanks defending Moscow. In December 1941, 16 per cent of the fighters defending Moscow were Hawker Hurricanes and Curtiss Tomahawks from Britain; by 1 January 1942, 96 Hurricane fighters were flying in the Soviet Air Forces (VVS). The British supplied radar apparatuses, machine tools, ASDIC and other commodities. During the summer months, convoys went as far north as 75 N latitude then south into the Barents Sea and to the ports of Murmansk in the Kola Inlet and Archangel in the White Sea. In winter, due to the polar ice expanding southwards, the convoy route ran closer to Norway. The voyage was between  each way, taking at least three weeks for a round trip.

Assembly of PQ 14
Convoys had a standard formation of short columns, number 1 to the left in the direction of travel. Each position in the column was numbered; 11 was the first ship in column 1 and 12 was the second ship in the column; 21 was the first ship in column 2. Ships in column sailed at intervals of  until 1943 when the interval was increased to  then  to cater for inexperienced captains reluctant to keep so close.

Cruiser and distant escorts

Convoy

8–12 April

The cruisers Edinburgh and Norfolk with the destroyers Foresight and Forrester sailed nearby. On the night of 10/11 April, south-west of Jan Mayen, the convoy ran into fog which held for thirty hours and sailed through pack ice for twelve hours. The convoy was thrown into disarray and many ships were damaged by the ice. Sixteen ships and the two minesweepers Hebe and Speedy were forced to turn back through damage or being unable to rejoin the convoy. The remaining eight ships, with Edinburgh and the twelve escorts, pressed on.

13–14 April
PQ 14 had no interference from German forces, though its reciprocal, Convoy QP 10, was attacked from its departure from Murmansk until it passed Bear Island three days later. On 11 April a ship was bombed and sunk and on 12 April, a U-boat attacked a destroyer and sank two merchant ships. A freighter was severely damaged on 13 April and sunk by its escorts. After fog descended, followed by a storm, a reconnaissance aircraft arrived on 14 April but the Germans were preparing to attack PQ 14. QP 10 suffered the loss of four vessels but shot down six aircraft, damaged one and evaded two destroyer sorties.

15–16 April

On 15 April, east of Bear Island, the convoy was sighted by German reconnaissance aircraft and desultory air attacks began. More determined air and submarine attacks were made on 16 April. Of the fifty-four men on board, about forty were able to abandon ship but the trawler Northern Wave was nearby when it depth-charged the U-boat, the shock of the explosions killing many of the crew in the water. The trawler Lord Middleton took 18 men on board, of whom nine, including Eric Rees the convoy commodore, died. Captain Downie survived and ascribed this to the insulating effect of becoming coated in oil. The vice-convoy commodore, Captain W. H. Lawrence, Master of Briarwood, took over. To the east of Bear Island,  narrowly missed Edinburgh.

17 April
At  on 17 April the convoy was joined by the local escort, comprising the Soviet destroyers  and Sokrushitelny, which had escorted QP 10 to 30°E then turned back with PQ 14. The Russian submarines K-1, K-2, K-3, S-101 and Shch-401 had provided a screen along the course of the convoy. At  several Ju 88 bombers arrived, one being shot down by the gunners on Briarwood as visibility was deteriorating; the bombers failed to hit any of the ships. At  the destroyer Bulldog attacked a submerged U-boat and claimed a possible sinking. The U-boat, possibly U-376, fired torpedoes to no effect as the convoy zig-zagged. As visibility got worse, no more air attacks were received.

18–19 April
The German 8th Destroyer Flotilla had sortied from Kirkenes against QP 10 on 12 and 13 April and at  Bonham Carter ordered Edinburgh out of the convoy. The visibility had increased and the ship hoisted battle ensigns as it bore west towards the superstructures of Hermann Shoemann, Z24 and Z25 which were above the horizon; the destroyers turned away and faded from view. Later in the day an attack by aircraft, submarines and surface ships was anticipated, thick fog "saved the convoy's bacon". German aircraft could be heard above the low cloud and the convoy gunners held their fire to avoid giving away the position of the ships. The weather began to clear and the British minesweepers Gossamer, Harrier, Hussar and Niger, based at Kola Inlet, arrived after turning back from QP 10. On the final leg to Kola, a north-westerly gale blew up. On 19 April the seven remaining ships entered Kola Inlet and docked at Murmansk. The seven ships and those of PQ 13 were attacked by Luftwaffe bombers as they were unloaded.

Aftermath
Despite the safe arrival of seven ships of PQ 14, that so many ships were forced to turn back with ice damage, created a shortfall in Lend-lease deliveries to the USSR. The Allies would have to run larger convoys during the hazardous summer months to catch up. Bonham Carter reported that the co-ordination of German aircraft and submarine attacks was a cause for concern as daylight hours increased towards the perpetual daylight of the midnight sun. Despite the recent reinforcement of convoy escorts, the last four days of the voyage would be under continuous observation and submarine attacks would increase just as the escorts were inhibited by shortage of fuel; Bonham Carter predicted serious losses.

Convoy PQ 14

Merchant ships
Data taken from Ruegg and Hague (1993) unless indicated.

Escort

German destroyer sortie
Data from Rohwer and Hümmelchen (2005) unless specified.

See also
 Arctic naval operations of World War II

Notes

Footnotes

References

Further reading

External links
 PQ 14

PQ 14
C